The Etruscan Arch or Arch of Augustus or Augustus Gate is one of eight gates in the Etruscan wall of Perusia, known today as Perugia. It is one of the only two surviving gates along with the Porta Marzia to the south.  It was constructed in the second half of the 3rd century BC and was restored by Augustus in 40 BC after his victory in the Perusine War. Representing the best surviving and most monumental of the Etruscan city gates it opens onto the cardo maximus of the city, corresponding to the modern Ulisse Rocchi Road.

It covers approximately a quarter of a square mile over three hills.

The arch consists of an attractive facade with a single archway and two trapezoidal towers. The archway forms a semicircular barrell vault passageway over 30 feet high. Two rows of voussoirs form the shape of the arch and are held in place by a keystone at the top.  Above the arch (in two concentric rows) there is an ornate Doric-inspired frieze of metopes with round shields and triglyphs in six vertical bands. Above this is another smaller voussoir arch between two pilasters making the height of the Etruscan Arch more than 60 feet.

On the internal face it is possible to read the inscription Augusta Perusia, which was the name of the city after the reconstruction of 40 BC; on the external face the inscription Colonia Vibia is inscribed, testimony to the ius coloniae received from Emperor Trebonianus Gallus (251–253).

The loggia on the left tower is an addition from the 16th century, while the fountain at the bottom of the same tower was completed in 1621.

In front of the arch is Palazzo Gallenga Stuart, the seat of the University for Foreigners Perugia.

See also

Bibliography

References

Buildings and structures completed in the 3rd century BC
Buildings and structures in Perugia
Etruscan sites
Etruscan architecture